Simona Postlerová (born 9 November 1964) is a Czech film, stage and television actress.

Career
Postlerová joined Vinohrady Theatre in Prague in the 1990s. She was named best female dubber at the 2002  for her revoicing of the character Vivian Bearing in the 2001 film Wit.

Personal life
Postlerová has two children with jazz musician Zdeněk Hrášek, to whom she was married until his death in 2016.

References

External links

1964 births
Living people
Actors from Plzeň
Czech film actresses
Czech television actresses
Czech stage actresses
Czech voice actresses
20th-century Czech actresses
21st-century Czech actresses
Academy of Performing Arts in Prague alumni